HMS Woolwich was a 54-gun fourth rate ship of the line of the Royal Navy, built by Phineas Pett III at Woolwich Dockyard and launched in 1675. She underwent a rebuild in 1702.

In 1705, when Thomas Ekines was in command, she was involved in the seizure of a Dutch ship which Ekines claimed was trading with Britains enemies of the War of the Spanish Succession. Although Ekines right to seize the ship was upheld, his further seizure of the bulk of the cargo for his personal gain caused major problems for his ongoing naval career.

On 10 June 1736 she was ordered to be stripped at Deptford Dockyard, and rebuilt by Richard Stacey to the lines of a 50-gun fourth rate according to the 1733 proposals of the 1719 Establishment. She was relaunched on 6 April 1741.

Woolwich was broken up at Chatham Dockyard in 1747.

Notes

References

Lavery, Brian (2003) The Ship of the Line - Volume 1: The development of the battlefleet 1650-1850. Conway Maritime Press. .

Ships of the line of the Royal Navy
1670s ships
Ships built in Woolwich
Ships built in Deptford